Eric Gyllenstierna af Lundholm (27 March 1882 – 26 June 1940) was a Swedish diplomat. Gyllenstierna served as Swedish envoy to the Soviet Union, Iran, Iraq, Turkey and Greece from 1937 to 1939.

Career
Gyllenstierna was born on 27 March 1882 at Krapperup Castle in Höganäs Municipality, Sweden, the son of landowner, Friherre Nils Gyllenstierna and his wife Ellen (née Stiernstedt). He was the brother of Major General Göran Gyllenstierna af Lundholm. He passed mogenhetsexamen in 1900 and received a Juris utriusque candidate degree from Lund University on 15 December 1909. Gyllenstierna served in the judge's office in Luggude Hundred and Medelstad Hundred from 1910 to 1912. Gyllenstierna held district court and judge appointments in Medelstad in 1912. Gyllenstierna was an assistant (Amanuens) at the Ministry of Civil Affairs from 1913 to 1915 and notary in the Committee on Agriculture from 1913 to 1915. He then served as secretary of the Parliamentary Ombudsman from 1915 to 1918 and he was a member and secretary of experts in the Committee Against Opposition to National Defence Propaganda (Kommittén mot försvarsfientlig propaganda) in 1917 as well as deputy director at the Ministry for Naval Affairs from 1917 to 1918.

He became acting extra head of department at the Ministry for Foreign Affairs on 29 October 1918 and first legation secretary in Helsinki on 12 September 1919. Gyllenstierna was acting first legation secretary in Paris from 26 September 1919 to 16 December 1921 when he became legation counsellor there. He was then legation counsellor and head of the Trade Policy Department's 3rd Bureau at the Ministry for Foreign Affairs from 28 August 1922 but became legation counsellor and head of the Political and Trade Policy Department's 3rd Bureau at the Ministry for Foreign Affairs from 1 September. Gyllenstierna was legation counsellor in London from 11 February 1927 and was appointed on 6 August 1930 to become envoy in Moscow from 1 October the same year. He was non-resident envoy (accredited from Moscow) in Tehran from 5 September 1930 to 1936. Gyllenstierna was also non-resident envoy (accredited from Moscow) in Baghdad from 18 May 1934 to 1936. He was then appointed on 20 December 1937 to become envoy in Ankara and non-resident envoy in Athens from 1 March 1938. Gyllenstierna retired and was appointed Envoy Extraordinary and Minister Plenipotentiary on 7 September 1939.

Personal life
On 21 December 1910 he married Wanda Charlotte Henriette Henriksson (1881–1917) in Gothenburg. In his second marriage he married on 22 February 1921 to Lovise Marie Henriette Crespy. They divorced on 25 June 1925. In his third marriage he married on 29 August 1925 to Signe Maria Fineman (born 7 January 1898), the daughter of Carl Gottfrid Fineman and Ebba af Geijerstam. They divorced on 13 July 1937. In Gyllenstierna's fourth and final marriage he married on 31 August 1937 in Helsingborg to Dorothy Mary Griffin (born 2 April 1895 in Wanstead, London, England), the daughter of Charles and Rose Griffin. They divorced on 19 September 1939. Gyllenstierna had one daughter, Wanda Ellen Beata (born 30 November 1917 in Stockholm).

After his father's death, Gyllenstierna inherited the entailed estates of Krapperup and Bjersgård, both in Scania.

Death
Gyllenstierna died on 26 June 1940 in Helsingborg.

Awards and decorations
   Commander 1st Class of the Order of the Polar Star (6 June 1932)
   Knight of the Order of the Polar Star (1922)
   1st Class of the Order of the Two Rivers
   1st Class of the Order of Homayoun
   Commander of the Order of Leopold (1927)
   Commander 2nd Class of the Order of Polonia Restituta (1926)
   Officer of the Legion of Honour (1921)

References

1882 births
1940 deaths
Ambassadors of Sweden to the Soviet Union
Ambassadors of Sweden to Iran
Ambassadors of Sweden to Iraq
Ambassadors of Sweden to Turkey
Ambassadors of Sweden to Greece
People from Höganäs Municipality
Lund University alumni
Commanders First Class of the Order of the Polar Star